The Chase is the second album from Norwegian singer-songwriter Marit Larsen. It was released on October 13, 2008. The first single of this album entitled "If a Song Could Get Me You" was made available via Marit Larsen's Myspace page on August 11, 2008.

Track listing

Chart

Singles

Technical credits
Marit Larsen – Vocals, arranger, Piano, Mandolin, Acoustic Guitar, Electric Guitar, Glockenspiel, Zither, Harmonica, Celeste, Hand Claps, Church Organ.
Kåre Christoffer Vestrheim – Producer, arranger, Piano, Harpsichord, Celeste, Cowbell, Hand Claps, Accordion, Electric Guitar.
Geir Sundstøl – Acoustic Guitar, Lap Steel Guitar, Mandolin, Harmonica, Harp, Dobro.
Michael Hartung – Acoustic Guitar, Hand Claps.
Erland Dahlen – Drums, Percussion.
Torstein Lofthus – Drums.
Kåre Opheim – Drums.
Even Ormestad, Thomas Tofte, Eirik Øien – Bass.
Odd Nordstoga – Acoustic Guitar, Guitar.
Henning Sandsdalen – Lap Steel Guitar.
Ørnulf Brun Snotheim – Electric Guitar.
Trude Eick – French Horn.
Eilert Mose – Piccolo Trumpet.
Marius Graff – Nylon String Guitar, Banjo
Andrik Orvik, Alyson Read, Jørn Hallbakken, Øyvind Fossheim, Vegar Johnsen – Violins.
Dorte Dreier, Cathrine Bullock, Åshild Nyhus, Ida Bryhn, Stig Ove Ose – Violas.
Geir Larsen, Anne Årdal, Hans Groh, Cecilia Gøtestam, Paulin Voss – Cellos.
Choir on "Is It Love" – Line Horntveth Vera Øian, Yngvild Flikke, Nina Ramberg, Caroline Hartung, Thom Hell, Christer Knutsen, Peer Øian, Hasse Rosbach
Artwork – Gina Rose Design
Photography – Julie Pike

Certifications

References

2008 albums
Marit Larsen albums